Denise Marie Stapley (née McCormick; born January 1, 1971) is an American sex therapist known as the winner of Survivor: Philippines, the 25th season of the reality TV competition series Survivor. She also participated in the 40th season, Survivor: Winners at War, the first all-winners season in Survivor history, finishing in sixth place.

Stapley is a licensed mental health therapist and the only American Association of Sexuality Educators, Counselors and Therapists certified sex therapist in the state of Iowa.

Survivor

Philippines
Stapley competed on the 25th season of the reality TV series Survivor, Survivor: Philippines. Originally placed on the ill-fated "Matsing" tribe, she and Malcolm Freberg were the only two castaways remaining when the tribe lost the first four consecutive immunity challenges, voting off Zane Knight, Roxanne "Roxy" Morris, Angie Layton, and Russell Swan by unanimous votes each time. Afterwards, Freberg was sent to the "Tandang" tribe while Stapley was sent to the "Kalabaw" tribe. Kalabaw subsequently lost the next two consecutive challenges, and in the first of these two tribal councils, Stapley received one vote from Sarah Dawson, while everyone else voted out Dawson. When the merge came, Stapley was on the winning team in the first two consecutive team-oriented reward challenges, and otherwise won the first individual immunity challenge right after the merge. She and Freberg managed to ride out the conflict between the members of the two former tribes, since both were perceived as outsiders who had no conflict with anyone else. However, Stapley was almost eliminated at the final seven, when she received the three votes of Jonathan Penner, Abi-Maria Gomes, and Carter Williams. However, Stapley, Freberg, Lisa Whelchel, and Michael Skupin voted for Penner, eliminating him instead. In the final two consecutive tribal councils, Stapley found herself receiving the sole vote of the person who was eliminated, while everyone else voted for said person: Gomes at the final five and Freberg at the final four. Stapley ultimately made it to the final three, alongside Whelchel and Skupin, where all three were mostly grilled by the jury of eight. However, Stapley was occasionally praised for making it to the end as a perceived underdog, surviving the ill-fated Matsing tribe, and the numerous tribal councils she attended. When the time for voting came, Stapley received six votes (all except Williams, who voted for Skupin, and Roberta "RC" Saint-Amour, who voted for Whelchel), thus winning the title of "Sole Survivor" and the $1 million prize.

As a result of her win, Stapley became the oldest female winner in Survivor history at age 41. She also set a Survivor record for becoming the first (and currently only) person in the history of the show to attend every single Tribal Council in the entire season. In a 2015 interview, host Jeff Probst named Stapley as one of his top ten favorite Survivor winners ever, and one of his top four favorite female winners.

Winners at War
Stapley would return to compete on the series' 40th season, Survivor: Winners at War, the first all-winners season in Survivor history. Initially placed on the Sele tribe, she forced a close relationship at the outset with Adam Klein, but immediately made themselves potential targets for wandering away from the rest of the tribe. However, both players managed to shift the target off of themselves and onto known pair Natalie Anderson and Jeremy Collins, and at the season's first tribal council, Anderson was blindsided. Stapley also formed strong bonds with Ben Driebergen, and through his guidance she was able to find her first Hidden Immunity Idol.

When the Tribe Switch occurred, Stapley and Collins found themselves transferred to the new Dakal tribe, along with original Dakal members Sandra Diaz-Twine, Tony Vlachos and Kim Spradlin-Wolfe. Stapley, who was seen as a less threatening player by the rest of her tribemates due to her reputation, was marked as a consensus target. Diaz-Twine, however, saw an opportunity to potentially gain an ally in Stapley by handing her an idol in hopes Stapley would cast a vote to get Collins or Vlachos out of the game without Diaz-Twine getting any blood on her hands. Stapley realized this, however, and at that night's tribal council, she played both immunity idols in her possession on both herself and Collins, negating the other players' votes on her. The sole deciding vote that night was Stapley's, and she singlehandedly blindsided the self-proclaimed "Queen of Survivor": Diaz-Twine. Stapley's move earned her the name of "Queenslayer" from other players and the press, and received a lot of praise from critics.

Stapley's legendary move gained her immediate respect among the other players in the game, but it also left a huge target on her once the tribes merged. Stapley, however, was able to secure herself with crucial immunity wins, as well as insulating herself in an alliance including Driebergen, Sarah Lacina and Tony Vlachos. But as the game wore on, Stapley found the game taking an emotional toll on her as well. After avoiding attention for much of the merge, she became a target at the Final Seven as a potential threat due to her successful move against Diaz-Twine, but at the last second, she was spared when her alliance blindsided Nick Wilson instead. However, when Anderson returned to the game from the Edge of Extinction at the Final Six, Stapley's luck ran out. She was eventually voted out on Day 36 in a rare Tribal Council situation that saw no vote counted during the first vote due to the use of three immunity idols, resulting in a second vote during which the four other players had to vote out either Stapley or Lacina, who were the only players without immunity. All four chose to vote out Stapley, who finished in sixth place. Overall, she received fourteen votes against her (including negated votes), more than anyone else during the season.

As a member of the jury, she cast her vote for Tony Vlachos to win. Vlachos would eventually win his second title of Sole Survivor in a 12-4-0 victory over Anderson and Michele Fitzgerald.

Personal life 
Stapley is married to Brad Stapley, an engineer, and they have one daughter together. Her mother is a two-time breast cancer survivor.

Filmography

Television

References

External links 
 
Denise Stapley biography for Survivor: Philippines at CBS.com

   

   

     
   

1971 births
Winners in the Survivor franchise
Living people
People from Cedar Rapids, Iowa
Survivor (American TV series) winners
Sex therapists